B36 Tórshavn is a Faroese semi professional football club based in the capital of Tórshavn, playing in the Faroe Islands Premier League, the top tier of Faroese football. B36 Tórshavn has always played its home games in Gundadalur. Originally all Faroese football teams played on gravel grounds, but starting in the late 1980s the grounds were changed into second generation artificial turf. All the artificial pitches have been changed into third generation artificial turf, approved by FIFA.

Today B36 Tórshavn is among the most successful football clubs in the Faroe Islands, having won the Faroe Islands Premier League 11 times, the Faroese Cup 6 times and the Faroese Super Cup once. The club also has a women's section, which is currently in the process of rebuilding. B36 Tórshavn is one of the biggest football clubs in the Faroe Islands, and is known for playing technical and positive football.

History

Founding

B36 Tórshavn was officially founded on 28 March 1936, but had already been playing matches since 1935. The capital was growing, and there was a lot of interest in football. B36 was founded by young people who wanted to play football, but had no opportunity to play for the existing club, HB Tórshavn. The initiative was taken by an entrepreneur called Niels Ejdesgaard, who became the first chairman of the new football club. When B36 was founded, they battled with local rivals for the rights to the Gundadalur Stadium, although both teams used the venue and played a number of derby matches there during that initial season. The conflict was solved by the mayor of Tórshavn, who decided that the stadium was to be shared equally between the two clubs. In 1946 the club were celebrated as national champions for the first time, and in 1965 the club won its first national cup.

Hard times

In 1962, B36 Tórshavn celebrated its fifth national championship, but dark times were to follow. The club would wait 35 years for its next national championship. To make matters worse, rival team HB Tórshavn experienced a lot of success in the same period. In the middle of the 1980s, B36 Tórshavn was relegated twice from the best division. Then in 1987, Kristian á Neystabø took over as chairman and Kjartan Mohr as cashier. They took on the task of rebuilding the club, and succeeded in making a turnaround. The results improved, and the cup was won in 1991, although the National Championship was lost in the final match that same year. Then, in 1997, the club celebrated its first National Championship in 35 years. Since then, B36 Tórshavn has been five-time champions, and have won the cup three times.

Local rivalry

In the last 20–25 years, the local rivalry with HB Tórshavn has increased, and now the two clubs are about equal in strength. In 2018, the teams fought a fierce cup final, which B36 Tórshavn won on penalties, after one of the most dramatic cup finals ever at The Faroe Islands. After two red cards in the end of the match, B36 Tórshavn was playing 9 against 11 from the stoppage time in the ordinary match and through all the extended time. In the 95th minute, B36 Tórshavn equalized to 2–2 with the last shot in the ordinary match from the youngster Hannes Agnarson, and went on to keep HB Tórshavn from scoring. This 9 against 11 was a repetition of the previous years 2nd leg of the cup semi finals, where B36 Tórshavn also played with 9 men in all the extended time and about 20 minutes of the ordinary time. Despite being down with 2 men, B36 Tórshavn won the match 3–2, when club legend Róaldur Jacobsen scored from 72 meters in the last minute.

Players abroad

Normally Faroese players who move abroad to play football are youngsters who join foreign clubs as academy players, but recently B36 Tórshavn has sold two senior players to Norwegian football teams. After last season the Faroese international defender Odmar Færø was sold to Hamarkameratene, where he now is playing regularly. Likewise, the former Faroe Islands national under-21 football team player Meinhard E. Olsen was sold to Kristiansund BK after last season. He is now working on establishing himself as a regular first team player. In June 2019, he made his debut on the Faroe Islands national football team in a match against Spain.

International players

B36 Tórshavn regularly delivers players to The Faroese National teams. Most recently, Árni Frederiksberg and Andrias Eriksen were called up for the home matches against Spain and Norway.

Former international players in the current team are: Jonas Tor Naes (56 matches), Róaldur Jakobsen (6 matches), Erling D. Jacobsen (5 matches). Alex Mellemgaard and Trygvi Askham have played one international match, and Eli F. Nielsen and Símun Rógvi Hansen have been called up, but not fielded, on the Faroese National Team.

Bjarni Petersen, Magnus Jacobsen, Hannes Agnarsson, Hugin Samuelsen, Benjamin Heinesen and Erlendur Magnusson play, or have played, on The Faroese U21 National Team.

International matches

Clubs in the Faroe Islands first took part in European competitions in 1992, after the Faroe Islands Football Association became a member of UEFA in 1990. B36 was drawn against Avenir Beggen in the Cup winners Cup Qualifying round in 1992. They came close, but didn't make it through to the first round after a 1–0 loss and a 1–1 draw at home.

In 2005/06, the team reached the second round in the UEFA Cup after defeating ÍBV Vestmannaeyar of Iceland 3–2 on aggregate. In the second round, they narrowly lost to Danish Superliga-club FC Midtjylland 1–2 in the away leg and drew 2–2 at home. The team reached the second qualifying round of the UEFA Champions League in 2006/07 after defeating Birkirkara FC of Malta 5–2 on aggregate and were eliminated in second qualifying round of the UEFA Champions League, losing both matches to Fenerbahçe 4–0 and 5–0.

In the 2018–19 UEFA Europa League, B36 reached the second qualifying round, after defeating St Joseph's Gibraltar on penalties in the preliminary round, after 2–2 on aggregate. The team also made it through the first qualifying round by defeating OFK Titograd from Montenegro after a 0–0 draw at home and a 2–1 victory away. In the second round, B36 Tórshavn was up against Beşiktaş Istanbul. That opposition was too strong, and the matches ended 0–2 and 0–6.

Current squad

Honours
 Faroe Islands Premier League: 11
 1946, 1948, 1950, 1959, 1962, 1997, 2001, 2005, 2011, 2014, 2015
 Faroe Islands Cup: 7
 1965, 1991, 2001, 2003, 2006, 2018, 2021
 Faroe Islands Super Cup: 1
 2007
 1. deild: 1
 1985

UEFA club competition record

Overview

Matches

In the 2020–21 season B36 became the first Faroese team to get through three rounds of a UEFA club competition.

Notes
 PR: Preliminary round
 QR: Qualifying round
 1Q: First qualifying round
 2Q: Second qualifying round
 3Q: Third qualifying round

Managers

 Petur Simonsen (1990–92)
 Jacek Burkhardt (1993–94)
 Páll Guðlaugsson (1994)
 Petur Simonsen (1995)
 Jógvan Nordbúð (1996)
 Tomislav Sivić (1997–99)
 Per Olov Andersson (2000)
 Piotr Krakowski (2000–02)
 Ion Geolgău (2002–03)
 Jóannes Jakobsen (2004)
 Sigfríður Clementsen (2005–06)
 Kurt Mørkøre (2007)
 Heðin Askham (2008)
 Mikkjal Thomassen (1 Jan 2009–09)
 Milan Cimburović (2009)
 Sigfríður Clementsen (2009–10)
 Allan Mørkøre (2010)
 John Petersen (2011)
 Mikkjal Thomassen (2011–13)
 Sámal Erik Hentze (2014)
 Eyðun Klakstein (2015–16)
 Jákup á Borg (2017–20)
 Dan Brimsvík (2020–)

Former players

  Kriss Guttesen was goalkeeper on the best team from 1946 to 1960. He won four National Champions titles with the club, and played three unofficial international matches.
  Tórður Holm was a great athlete, who performed in several disciplines. In football he was well known as a very strong defender. He won four National Champions titles and one Cup title with the club, and played 11 unofficial international matches.
  Baldvin Baldvinsson was a notorious goalgetter, who played for the club during the 60s and 70s. He won one National Champions title and one Cup title with the club, and played five unofficial international matches. After stopping his career as player he became one of the most respected referees in Faroese football.
  Eiler Mouritsen was a skilled midfielder who played for the club during the 70s. 
  Tummas Eli Hansen was a rock solid centre defender, who in 1997 lead the club to the first National Champions title in 35 years. He also won one Cup title with the club, and played 27 official and 4 unofficial matches for The Faroe Islands.
  Jens Kristian Hansen is the brother of Tummas Eli Hansen. He spent most of his career in B36, with shorter spella in Denmark and Scotland. He won the National Champions title and Cup title twice. On international level he played 44 matches for The Faroe Islands scoring three goals, the most famous one against Spain in a WC qualifyer. He also played two unofficial international matches.
  John Petersen was a striker, who spent the best part of his career at the club, winning two National Champions titles, two Cup titles, and scoring a total of 54 goals. He was for several years the record goalscorer in Faroe Islands Premier League with 147 goals. He played 57 matches for The Faroe Islands scoring 6 goals. 
  Jákup á Borg is an all-time favorite and notorious crowdpleaser in B36 Tórshavn, even though he spent four seasons with the local rivals HB Tórshavn. He won five National Champions titles with B36 and two with HB Tórshavn. In addition to this he won three Cup titles, two with B36, and one with the rivals. He scored a record total of 153 goals in the Faroe Islands Premier League, only recently beaten. He also played 61 matches for The Faroe Islands scoring 2 goals. Jákup á Borg is the current manager of B36 Tórshavn.
  Klæmint Matras also known as Mr. B36, played as a defensive midfielder, and his whole-hearted unconditional play and fighting skills made him a legend in the crowd. He captained the team during several seasons, winning four National Champions titles and three Cup titles. He is registered with 2 matches for The Faroe Islands. 
  Łukasz Cieślewicz is a Polish national who has played most of his career with B36 Tórshavn. He and his family originally came to The Faroes when he was a teenager. His father, Robert Cieślewicz, was a professional footballer, who played at The Faroes for a couple of years. After a few years in Danish football, Łukasz joined the club in 2011. He immediately became one of the star players in Faroe Islands Premier League, and has won three National Champions title and one Cup title with the club. After last season he left the club, and is now playing for Víkingur Gøta.
  Róaldur Jacobsen is an attacking midfielder who has played his entire career with B36. He is one of the best technical skilled players in the Faroese league, and is an excellent freekick taker. He has won three National Champions title and one Cup title with the club. On international level he has played 6 matches for The Faroe Islands and several U21 matches. He has retired from football because of injuries.
  Odmar Færø is considered to be one of the best Faroese defenders ever. He has played with B36 Tórshavn for most of his career, many of those years as captain. He has won three National Champions title and one Cup title with the club. He is a current Faroe Islands international, and is registered with 29 matches. After the 2018 season he moved to Hamarkameratene in Norway, but decided to return after one season, and is now playing for KÍ Klaksvík. His father and grandfather are also named Odmar Færø, and they have both played with B36 and represented The Faroe Islands.
 Lukas Enevoldsen

References

External links

 Official website 

 
Football clubs in Tórshavn
Association football clubs established in 1936
1936 establishments in the Faroe Islands